2010–11 in Kenyan football may refer to:
2010 in Kenyan football
2011 in Kenyan football